Anis Yadir (born 29 October 2004) is a Dutch footballer who plays as a midfielder for de Graafschap in the Eerste Divisie.

Career
From June 2022 he was included in first team training at De Graafschap after signing a three-year professional contract.
He made his professional debut in the KNVB Cup against Rijnsburgse Boys on 18 October, 2022 scoring in a 3-1 win. He also scored on his Eerste Divisie debut on 11 November 2022 as Jong PSV played away at De Graafschap at the De Vijverberg. He scored a late winner in a 3-2 win for his side.

Personal life
Born in the Netherlands, Yadir is of Moroccan descent.

References

External links
 

2004 births
Living people
Dutch footballers
Dutch sportspeople of Moroccan descent
Association football midfielders
De Graafschap players
Eerste Divisie players
People from Zutphen